Hacettepe Üniversitesi Basketbol Kulübü (English: Hacettepe University Basketball Club) is a professional basketball team of based in Ankara, Turkey. The team is the official athletics branch of Hacettepe University. Their home arena is the Ankara Arena with a capacity of 10,400 seats, which was opened in 2010.

History
The team was founded in 1982. In 2011, Hacettepe Üniversitesi was promoted to the Turkish Basketball League for the first time since their foundation.

Season by season

Current roster

Notable players

References

External links 
 

Hacettepe University
Basketball teams in Turkey
Sports teams in Ankara
Student sport in Turkey